James Parkinson was an English footballer who played in the Football League for Bolton Wanderers.

1888-1889
James Parkinson made his League and Club debut, playing at full–back, on 15 September 1888 at Pike's Lane, then home of Bolton Wanderers. The opposition were Burnley and Bolton Wanderers lost the match 4–3. James Parkinson appeared in two of the 22 League games played by Bolton Wanderers in season 1888–89. James Parkinson, as goalkeeper, (one appearance) was part of a Bolton Wanderers defence that kept the opposition to one-League-goal-in-a-match once.

References

Year of birth unknown
Date of death unknown
English footballers
Bolton Wanderers F.C. players
English Football League players
Association football goalkeepers